Sverre Johannes Aarseth, (born 20 July 1934) is a research scientist at the Institute of Astronomy at the University of Cambridge. Although retired, Aarseth is still an active researcher. He has dedicated his career to the development of N-body codes. He is the author of the NBODY family of codes, the current iteration is NBODY7. His current areas of research include the effects of stellar evolution in N-body codes, the influence of black holes on stellar systems, the evolution of globular clusters, and the use of GPUs to increase the speed of his codes.

Aarseth was a visiting scholar at the Institute for Advanced Study in 1986-87.  He was awarded the 1998 Brouwer Award for his work on advancing dynamical astronomy. The asteroid 9836 Aarseth is named in his honour.

Outside of research, Aarseth's interests include mountaineering, trekking and wildlife. He is also a keen chess player, and was awarded the title International Master for Correspondence in 1981.

References

External links 
 Sverre Aarseth's homepage
 N-body page

Living people
Institute for Advanced Study visiting scholars
20th-century British astronomers
Astronomers at the University of Cambridge
1934 births
Norwegian expatriates in the United Kingdom